The Sandy River Bridge, also known as the Troutdale Bridge, is a bridge spanning the Sandy River in Troutdale, Oregon, United States.

See also
List of bridges documented by the Historic American Engineering Record in Oregon
List of bridges on the National Register of Historic Places in Oregon

References

External links

Bridges in Oregon
Historic American Engineering Record in Oregon
Troutdale, Oregon